Winter Garden Theatre (London) Ltd v Millennium Productions Ltd [1948] AC 173 is an English land law case, concerning licenses in land.

Facts
At the Winter Garden Theatre (now the Gillian Lynne Theatre on Drury Lane) the owner promised Millennium Productions Ltd that it could use the theatre for six months, with an option to renew for another six months, and after that it could continue for a flat weekly price of £300. Millennium would have to give a month's notice if it wished to terminate, but Winter Garden's obligations were not stated. The licence continued for over a year, to September 1945. Then Millennium made a contract with artists to show Young Mrs Barrington, from 5 September till January 1946, but on 13 September Winter Garden decided to revoke the licence, giving a month's notice, and demanding it leave on 13 October. Millennium argued that there was a breach of contract and that Winter Garden could only revoke if Millennium was in breach of contract, or that there had to be a (revised) reasonable notice period, one month no longer being reasonable.

Judgment
The House of Lords held that Winter Garden could revoke the licence. Viscount Simon said that someone who gives a licence, revoking it mid-use, to cross land would not make the licensee a trespasser until they were off the premises, but then future crossing rights would cease.

Lord Porter said the following.

Lord Uthwatt said the following.

Lord Macdermott said the following.

Significance
Part II of a statute which continues to this day was made to provide business tenants with the guarantee of a new lease unless they expressly contracted out of its guarantees. The statute is the Landlord and Tenant Act 1954.

Followed in
In re Spenborough Urban District Council’s Agreement [1968] Ch 139;

Applied in
Verrall v Great Yarmouth BC [1981] EWCA
Hounslow London Borough Council v Twickenham Garden Developments Ltd [1971] Ch 233;

Distinguished in
Ashburn Anstalt v Arnold [1989] EWCA

See also

English trusts law
English land law
English property law

Notes

English land case law
House of Lords cases
1948 in case law
1948 in British law